Plaudit (1895–1919) was an American Thoroughbred racehorse. A descendant of English Triple Crown champion, West Australian, he was bred by Dr. John D. Neet, owner of Kindergarten Stud at Versailles, Kentucky. Plaudit is best known for winning the 1898 Kentucky Derby.

Conditioned by future U.S. Racing Hall of Fame trainer Edward D. Brown, racing at age two Plaudit won four of his twelve starts. After finishing fourth in the Futurity Stakes at Sheepshead Bay Race Track, he was bought by noted Kentucky horseman, John E. Madden and in a race for older horses in September, defeated the 1896 Kentucky Derby winner Ben Brush. As a three-year-old, Plaudit was ridden by future U.S. Racing Hall of Fame jockey, Willie Simms in the 24th edition of the Kentucky Derby. Plaudit came from behind with a powerful stretch drive to catch the betting favorite Lieber Karl and win by a nose.

In 1898 Plaudit won four of his eight races and finished second in the other four, notably in the Latonia Derby. His wins included a second defeat of Lieber Karl in the Clark Handicap. Retired at the end of the racing season, Plaudit stood at stud at John Madden's Hamburg Place in Lexington, Kentucky.

Plaudit was from Cinderella who was also the mare of Hastings, the 1896 Belmont Stakes winner and Leading sire in North America in 1902 and 1908. While Plaudit never matched Hastings' success as a sire, he produced a dozen graded stakes race winners including multiple stakes champion, King James. However, his greatest contribution as a sire is his grandson, the American Quarter Horse Hall of Fame horse named after him, Plaudit.

Plaudit died in 1919 and is buried in the Hamburg Place equine cemetery.

Pedigree

References
 Plaudit's 1898 Kentucky Derby
Plaudit at the Thoroughbred Heritage website

Specific

1895 racehorse births
1919 racehorse deaths
Racehorses bred in Kentucky
Racehorses trained in the United States
Kentucky Derby winners
Thoroughbred family 21-a